The Vire is a river in Normandy, France whose  course crosses the départements of Calvados and Manche, flowing through the towns of  Vire, Saint-Lô and Isigny-sur-Mer, finally flowing out into the English Channel. Its main tributaries are the Aure, the Elle and the Souleuvre.

The outflow of the Vire has been canalized and forms the port of Isigny-sur-Mer.

The poets of the Vire valley (Vau de Vire) are said to have given rise to vaudeville.

Places along the river:
 Calvados (14) : Vire, Pont-Farcy, Isigny-sur-Mer
 Manche (50) : Tessy-sur-Vire, Troisgots, Torigni-sur-Vire, Condé-sur-Vire, Sainte-Suzanne-sur-Vire, Saint-Lô, Rampan, Pont-Hébert, La Meauffe, Cavigny

Hydrology and water quality
The generally brownish waters of the Vire are moderately alkaline having been tested by Lumina Tech as pH 8.31. The river waters are relatively turbid, with a Secchi disc measurement of 12 centimetres.

Historical significance
At the turn of the 10th century, the territorial lands of the Kingdom of Brittany had been expanded up to the Vire by their king Alan I.

References

External links
 Atlas des Routes de France, Solar Press: Donnees IGN (2007)
 

Rivers of France
Rivers of Normandy
Rivers of Calvados (department)
Rivers of Manche
0Vire